(born  on September 2, 1957, in Shizuoka, Japan) is a Japanese pop singer and actress. She is better known by her nickname Kei, and is one half of Pink Lady, the top idol group in Japan in the 1970s. In the United States, they are known for their self-titled TV program. Masuda is represented by her own management firm .

Biography

Early life
Keiko Kobayashi was the second daughter of Shōhei and Fusae Kobayashi. After her father was killed in a vehicular accident on April 14, 1961, she was adopted by the Masuda family (from her mother's side) and moved to Yaizu. In 1972, a year after transferring to Suehiro Junior High School, Masuda met Mitsuyo Nemoto. A year later, they attended Tokoha University and the Yamaha Music School in Hamamatsu. In May 1974, the duo formed a folk group called  and passed Yamaha's  audition.

Pink Lady
After winning an audition on the talent show Star Tanjō! in March 1976, Masuda and Nemoto signed with Victor Entertainment and became Pink Lady. Masuda became  while Nemoto took the stage name . After their debut single "Pepper Keibu" peaked at No. 4 on Oricon's singles charts in August 1976, Pink Lady's second single "S.O.S." reached No. 1, beginning a nine-song streak of No. 1 hits from November 1976 to December 1978. Their biggest single was "UFO" which spent 10 weeks at No. 1 and sold over 1.55 million copies.

When their popularity took a downturn in 1979, Pink Lady turned their focus on the United States, with their first U.S. single "Kiss in the Dark" reaching No. 37 on the Billboard Hot 100 and becoming the first Japanese recording act to chart in America since Kyu Sakamoto in 1963. In 1980, the duo starred with comedian Jeff Altman in the NBC variety show Pink Lady and Jeff. Unfortunately, the show was plagued by the language barrier between the duo and the production crew. Poor ratings and scathing reviews resulted in Pink Lady and Jeff being cancelled after five episodes, with a sixth episode remaining unaired.

Following the failure of Pink Lady and Jeff, as well as the decline of disco music, Pink Lady held a press conference on September 1, 1980, to announce their disbandment within six months. During the press conference, Kei stated that she would revert to her real name for her solo career. Pink Lady performed their final concert at Korakuen Stadium on March 31, 1981, before going their separate ways. Mie and Kei have since reunited several times to record new songs and perform special concerts.

Solo career
Following Pink Lady's disbandment, Masuda signed with Reprise Records and released her first solo single  on November 28, 1981. Written by Miyuki Nakajima, the song made it to No. 9 on Oricon's singles chart and sold 267,000 copies. In contrast to Pink Lady and Mie's pop style, Masuda's solo efforts focused on more traditional kayōkyoku with her uniquely deep voice.

Masuda put her solo career on hiatus in 1986, but in 1989, she made her debut in France with the album Simples Confidences, which consisted of six French-language and four English-language songs. The album was released in Japan as Voice Cologne. During this time, Masuda used the stage name "kéi" as a singer while retaining her real name as an actress. She also released her gravure book  in 1990.

In 2001, Masuda starred as Vi Moore in the Japanese adaptation of the Footloose stage musical. The production also featured her Pink Lady partner Mie as Ethel McCormack.

In September 2004, Masuda released her autobiography . A year later, she released , her first single in 15 years. In 2008, Masuda released , her first solo album in 19 years. The album features self-covers of her solo singles and the Pink Lady hit songs "UFO" and "Nagisa no Sindbad".

On February 21, 2018, Masuda released the single /, 13 years after her last single. The songs were composed by Tokiko Kato and Yū Aku, and previously recorded by Kato.

In 2019, Masuda starred as Julietta in the stage musical .

In April 2022, Masuda released the single "Del Sole" to commemorate the 40th anniversary of her solo career. She also announced the release of the compilation album Soshite, Koko kara..., which will include her past singles and five new recordings, plus the recording of her 40th anniversary concert in November 2021. The limited edition release of the album will include a DVD of the concert.

Personal life 
In 1979, Masuda had a publicized relationship with singer Goro Noguchi. This affair put a strain between her and Pink Lady's management T&C Music, who forbade the relationship, especially when the duo were preparing to work in the U.S. Eventually, Masuda's engagement to Noguchi led to Pink Lady's disbandment two years later. The relationship was dissolved in 1984 when Noguchi had an affair with actress Keiko Saito.

On June 23, 2002, Masuda married , president of the sound production company .

Health issues
On December 16, 1977, Masuda collapsed backstage after a Pink Lady show. She was rushed to the hospital, where doctors discovered that she had burst an appendix. Following the surgery, she went against doctors' orders and continued to perform by wrapping her midsection with plastic wrap to keep the stitches closed and prevent any pus from ruining her costumes.

Masuda suffers from Graves' disease. In an interview with Yomiuri Shimbun, she first felt the symptoms of the disease in 1990 and temporarily stepped away from her singing and acting career when her tremors and sudden weight loss became evident. She revealed that her elder sister also has Graves' disease. Masuda struggled with a swollen thyroid during Pink Lady's 2003 tour; despite concerns from fans, she refused to conceal her neck. She has since kept her condition stable with proper treatment.

In 2013, Masuda revealed that she also has Ménière's disease. She said that she experienced sudden hearing loss during her late 20s and was diagnosed with the disease in 2010 when she started developing the same symptoms.

Discography

Studio albums

International releases

Compilation albums

Cover albums

Singles

Bibliography
  (Wani Books, 1990 October)
  (Gentosha, 2004 September)

References

External links 
 
  (Victor Entertainment)
  (Nippon Columbia)
  (Warner Music Japan)
 English Pink Lady Fansite

Japanese idols
Japanese women pop singers
Japanese musical theatre actresses
1957 births
Living people
People from Shizuoka (city)
Musicians from Shizuoka Prefecture
People with Ménière's Disease
Victor Entertainment artists